The 2017–18 Utah State Aggies men's basketball team represented Utah State University in the 2017–18 NCAA Division I men's basketball season. The Aggies, led by third-year head coach Tim Duryea, played their home games at the Smith Spectrum in Logan, Utah as members of the Mountain West Conference. They finished the season 17-17 overall and 8-10 in conference play, finishing tied for 7th. In the Mountain West Conference tournament, they defeated Colorado State in the first round and Boise State in the quarterfinals before losing to New Mexico in the semi-finals.

On March 11, 2018, head coach Tim Duryea was fired after three seasons. He finished at Utah State with a three-year record of 47–49. On March 25, reports indicated that the school had hired South Dakota head coach Craig Smith as head coach, which was confirmed the next day.

Previous season
The Aggies finished the 2016–17 season 14–17, 7–11 in Mountain West play to finish in tie for eighth place. They defeated San Jose State in the first round of the Mountain West tournament to advance to the quarterfinals where they lost to Nevada.

Offseason

Departures

Incoming transfers

Recruiting
Utah State did not have any incoming players in the 2017 recruiting class.

Preseason 
In a vote by conference media at the Mountain West media day, the Aggies were picked to finish in eighth place in the Mountain West. Sophomore guard Koby McEwen was named to the preseason All-Mountain West team.

Roster

Source

Schedule and results

|-
!colspan=9 style=| Exhibition

|-
!colspan=9 style=| Non-conference regular season

|-
!colspan=9 style=| Mountain West regular season

|-
!colspan=9 style=| Mountain West tournament

References 

Utah State Aggies
Utah State Aggies men's basketball seasons
Aggies
Aggies